Labiobarbus lineatus is a species of cyprinid fish found in Thailand.

Habitat 
Freshwater

Dispersion 
National water resources

Utilization

References

lineatus
Fish of Thailand
Cyprinid fish of Asia
Taxa named by Henri Émile Sauvage
Fish described in 1878